Passion is a 2004 album by K-Pop singer Lee Jung Hyun. In a change from her previous style, the music is Latin-influenced rather than purely techno.

Track listing
 World (Intro)
 따라해봐 / Ttarahaebwa (Follow Me)
 베사메무쵸 / Besame Mucho (Bésame Mucho)
 건들지마 / Geondeuljima (Don't Bother Me)
 A Midsummer Night Dream
 기다려 (Interlude) / Gidaryeo (Interlude) (Wait - Interlude)
 Domino
 Escape
 우린 아직 사랑하고 있다 / Urin Ajik Saranghago Itta (We Still Love Each Other)
 일장춘몽 / Iljang Chunmong (An Empty Dream)
 Moonlight
 독백 (Outro) / Dokbaek (Outro) (Monologue - Outro)
 따라해봐 Gazebal Trial Mix 
 건들지마 Ez Life Trance Mix

2004 albums
Lee Jung-hyun albums